The Lieb–Liniger model describes a gas of particles moving in one dimension and satisfying Bose–Einstein statistics.

Introduction
A model of a gas of particles moving in one dimension and satisfying Bose–Einstein statistics was introduced in 1963   in order to study whether the available approximate theories of such gases, specifically Bogoliubov's theory, would conform to the actual properties of the model gas.  The model is based on a well defined Schrödinger Hamiltonian for particles interacting with each other via a two-body potential, and all the eigenfunctions and eigenvalues of this Hamiltonian can, in principle, be calculated exactly. Sometimes it is called one dimensional Bose gas with delta interaction. It also can be considered as quantum non-linear Schrödinger equation.

The ground state as well as the low-lying excited states were computed and found to be in agreement with Bogoliubov's theory when the potential is small, except for the fact that there are actually two types of elementary excitations instead of one, as predicted by Bogoliubov's and other theories.

The model seemed to be only of academic interest until, with the sophisticated experimental techniques developed in the first decade of the 21st century, it became possible to produce this kind of gas using real atoms as particles.

Definition and solution of the model
There are  boson particles with coordinates  on the line , with periodic boundary conditions. Thus, a state of the N-body system must be described by a wave function  that remains unchanged under permutation of any two particles (permutation symmetry), i.e.,  for all  and  satisfies  for all . The Hamiltonian, in appropriate units, is

 

where  is the Dirac delta function,  i.e., the interaction is a contact interaction. The constant  denotes its strength. The hard core limit  is known as the Tonks–Girardeau gas.

Since  is symmetric it is completely determined by its values in the simplex , defined by the condition that . That is, for certain real numbers , to be determined,

 

The coefficients , as well as the 's are determined by the condition , and this leads to
 
 

These equations determine  in terms of the 's, which, in turn, are determined by the periodic boundary conditions. These lead to  equations:

 

where  are integers when  is odd and, when  is even, they take values  . For the ground state the 's satisfy
 

The first kind of elementary excitation consists in choosing  as before, but increasing  by an amount  (or decreasing  by ).

The momentum of this type of excitation is limited to 

These excitations can be combined and repeated many times. Thus, they are bosonic-like.

Thermodynamic limit

To evaluate  we assume that the N 's lie between numbers  and , to be determined, and with a density . This  is found to satisfy the equation (in the interval )

 

which has a unique positive solution. An excitation distorts this density  and similar integral equations determine these distortions. The ground state energy per particle is given by

 

At , .

From three to one dimension.
This one-dimensional gas can be made using real, three-dimensional atoms as particles.  One can prove, mathematically, from the Schrödinger equation for three-dimensional particles in a long cylindrical container, that the low energy states are described by the one-dimensional Lieb–Liniger model. This was done for the ground state and for excited states. The cylinder does not have to be as narrow as the atomic diameter; it can be much wider if the excitation energy in the direction perpendicular to the axis is large compared to the energy per particle .

References

External links
 See also Elliott H. Lieb (2008), Scholarpedia, 3(12):8712.

Statistical mechanics